The East Cornwall Times is a weekly local newspaper first published in 1859. It covers the mid-East area of Cornwall, including Gunnislake and Drakewalls, Callington, Calstock and Kelly Bray. It is now owned by the Tindle Newspaper Group, and published as an offshoot of the Tavistock Times.

Newspapers published in Cornwall
1859 establishments in England
Newspapers established in 1859